The Milwaukee-class monitors were a class of four riverine ironclad monitors built during the American Civil War. Several supported Union forces along the Mississippi River in mid-1864 before participating in the Battle of Mobile Bay in August. Chickasaw and Winnebago bombarded Confederate coastal fortifications during the battle and during subsequent operations as well as engaging the ironclad Tennessee II. The other two ships arrived at Mobile Bay after the battle and all four supported the land attacks on Mobile in March–April 1865. Milwaukee struck a torpedo during this time and sank. The surviving three ships were sold in 1874; Chickasaw was converted into a ferry and survived until 1944 when she was scuttled. Her wreck was discovered in 2004.

Design and description
James Eads received the contract to build four iron-hulled, twin-turreted ironclads, partly due to the influence of Missouri Congressman Frank P. Blair, Jr. Eads retained two of the ships, but subcontracted the other two to other builders.

The ships were 970 tons burthen and displaced .

They were powered by two 2-cylinder horizontal non-condensing steam engines, each driving two  propellers, using steam generated by seven tubular boilers. They carried  of coal.

The ships' main armament consisted of four smoothbore, muzzle-loading 11-inch Dahlgren guns mounted in two twin-gun turrets. The fore turret in each ship, except , was designed by Eads, while the aft turret was the standard Ericsson design used in most Union monitors. Unlike the latter, which rested its entire weight on a central spindle that had to be elevated in order for the turret to rotate, Eads' design better distributed its weight because it rested on a number of ball bearings underneath the outer edge of the turret. The structure of the Eads turret extended down to be bottom of the ship and the entire structure rotated. The guns in the Eads turret were mounted on a steam-powered platform that moved up and down, so that the guns could be reloaded below deck, safe from enemy interference.
Both turrets used steam engines to rotate, but the Eads design also used it to power virtually every function in the turret, including running out the guns, absorbing the recoil from firing, and opening the gun ports to allow the guns to fire. The ability to adjust the level of the turret floor doubled the elevation of the guns to +20° compared to the +10° allowed in an Ericsson turret. Another advantage was that the Eads turret only required a crew of six men, far fewer than the Ericsson design.

The cylindrical turrets were protected by eight layers of wrought iron  plates above the deck. Below the deck the side of the Eads turret was only a single layer thick and had holes through which the guns were loaded.

Ships

Careers
Chickasaw and Winnebago, the first two ships to be commissioned, spent some time patrolling the Mississippi River and supporting Union forces operating along its length before they were transferred to the West Gulf Blockading Squadron in early July 1864 to support the impending attack on the defenses of Mobile, Alabama Rear Admiral David Farragut organized the four monitors present into a separate column leading his wooden ships to engage Fort Morgan while the other ships proceeded into the Bay itself. Tecumseh struck a torpedo in front of the fort and a small boat from the gunboat  rescued 10 survivors and delivered them to Winnebago. The latter's aft turret had jammed during her bombardment of Fort Morgan while Chickasaws funnel had been riddled with holes, significantly reducing her speed.

The Confederate ironclad Tennessee attacked Farragut's wooden ships without much effect after they had passed the Confederate forts, and she was engaged by Winnebago before she disengaged and briefly took shelter under Fort Morgan's guns. About a half-hour later, the ironclad attacked Farragut's ships again. The monitors were not initially engaged, but Chickasaw managed to assume a position by the Tennessees stern and fired repeatedly at point-blank range. Her shots failed to penetrate the Tennessees armor, but they did jam the armored shutter for the stern gun port and cut her exposed steering chains, rendering her unable to steer. When the crew attempted to unjam the shutter, one shell struck the edge of the shutter, creating fragments that killed the machinist attempting to knock out the shutter's retaining pin and broke Admiral Franklin Buchanan's leg. This damage, together with damage inflicted by the other Union ships, persuaded Commander James D. Johnston to surrender his ship. The two monitors remained in Mobile Bay and subsequently bombarded Fort Morgan and Fort Gaines until they surrendered less than three weeks later.

The other two monitors were commissioned too late to participate in the battle. After supporting forces near the mouth of the Red River during the summer, Kickapoo was transferred to the West Gulf Blockading Squadron in October for operations against Mobile itself; Milwaukee was also transferred to the West Gulf Blockading Squadron that same month.

Union forces were too weak to attack the city itself until March 1865. The monitors moved up the Blakeley River at the end of the month to cut off Confederate communications with Spanish Fort while Union troops besieged the fort. Milwaukee and Winnebago sortied upriver on 28 March to attack a Confederate transport and Milwaukee struck a torpedo while returning from the sortie. Her entire crew survived and was rescued by Kickapoo. The following day Kickapoo rescued the crew of the monitor , which had also struck a torpedo and sunk. After the occupation of Selma, Alabama, in early April, Winnebago escorted a troop convoy to Selma and Montgomery, Alabama, and then blockaded the Tombigbee River to prevent the ironclad Nashville and other Confederate ships from interfering with Union forces.

After the war, the three surviving ships were decommissioned and later sold on 12 September 1874. Chickasaws new owners converted her to sidewheel propulsion and she became a coal and railroad ferry until 1944, when she was scuttled. Her wreck was discovered in 2004. Milwaukees wreck was salvaged after the war, and some of her iron was used in building the Eads Bridge over the Mississippi at St. Louis.

Notes

References

 

 

 
Monitor classes
Riverine warfare